Socrates II is a chess program that, in 1993, won the 23rd North American Computer Chess Championship. It ran on an IBM PC. This was the first and only time that a stock microcomputer won this event, finishing ahead of past winners Cray Blitz and HiTech.  The authors, Don Dailey and Larry Kaufman, renewed their collaboration twenty years later to create the Komodo chess engine.

See also 
 Kasparov's Gambit

References
ACM COMPUTER CHESS by Bill Wall

Chess software